During the 1950–51 season Football Club Internazionale competed in Serie A.

Summary 
Aldo Olivieri took for him the job of Giulio Cappelli as manager in round eight of the championship. President Masseroni bought defenders Ivano Blason from Triestina and Bruno Padulazzi from Lucchese, being signed too Lennart Skoglund. Arrival of the Swedish player in addition to the attacking line up with Nyers, Lorenzi and topscorer Wilkes, diminished chances of play for striker Amadei whom was transferred out to S.S.C. Napoli. Helped by an amazing campaign with 107 goals scored, the squad competed for the trophy with Milan losing, unexpectedly, the last two away matches of the season. Inter did not  reach to surpass its city rivals on the table and lost the league trophy by one single point.

Squad

Competitions

Serie A

League table

Matches

Statistics

Players statistics

References

Bibliography

External links 
Serie A 1950-1951, calcio.com.

Inter Milan seasons
Internazionale Milano